Szabolcs Kanta (born 29 January 1982 in Ajka) is a Hungarian football (Midfielder) player.

References
HLSZ 
MLSZ 

1982 births
Living people
People from Ajka
Hungarian footballers
Hungary youth international footballers
Association football midfielders
MTK Budapest FC players
BFC Siófok players
Nyíregyháza Spartacus FC players
FC Ajka players
Nemzeti Bajnokság I players
Sportspeople from Veszprém County